Liberty is a television film which aired on NBC on June 23, 1986. It is a largely fictionalized account of the construction of the Statue of Liberty, which had been completed 100 years earlier.

Scenes were shot on location in Paris and Baltimore.

Plot
Sculptor Frédéric Auguste Bartholdi (Frank Langella) and author Édouard de Laboulaye (Jean-Pierre Cassel) agree to create a monument to present to the United States on behalf of the French people. Bartholdi searches for a model, approaching (and romancing) young woman Jeanne Baheau (Corinne Touzet) for the body of the statue, and deciding to use his mother (Claire Bloom) as a model for its face.

Enlisted to help with its construction are immigrant coppersmith Jacque Marchant (Chris Sarandon), shop owner Seamus Reilly (George Kennedy), and assistant Robert Johnson (LeVar Burton). Marchant falls in love with poet Emma Lazarus (Carrie Fisher), who supplies the sonnet "The New Colossus" for the base of the statue.

Cast

Reception
Reviews of Liberty were generally negative. Jeff Jarvis of People called it "as pretentious as a high school sophomore trying to act like a college freshman." Clifford Terry of the Chicago Tribune described it as "turgid as well as ludicrous, drawing upon the device of meshing fictional and historical characters."

Screenwriter Pete Hamill was unhappy with the finished product, and had his name changed to "Robert Malloy" in the credits.

References

External links
 

1986 television films
1986 films
American historical films
Films set in the 19th century
Films shot in Baltimore
Films shot in Paris
NBC network original films
Films directed by Richard C. Sarafian
1980s American films